Events from the year 1756 in Sweden

Incumbents
 Monarch – Adolf Frederick

Events

 February - A conflict between the Riksdag and the King and the Queen result in the removal of the current governor of Crown Prince Gustav, who is replaced by a new one, appointed by the parliament. 
 26 May - The parliament begun to use a name stamp with the signature of the King, when the monarch refuses to sign papers of state. 
 July - The Coup of 1756 of Queen Louisa Ulrika, in which she planned to replace the reinstate the absolute monarchy by the support of the Hovpartiet, is exposed. 
 23 July - Eight participants in the Queen's planned Coup d'état is executed in Stockholm. 
 - The common Moonshine manufacturing of brännvin is banned. 
 - Ban on the import of coffee.
 - Sweden and Denmark conduct an alliance at sea to protect the ships at the North Sea.
 - The Great awakening movement starts in the province of Finland, inspired by Lisa Eriksdotter.
 - En swensks tankar öfwer den 22 junii 1756. Sthlm 1756. by Elisabeth Stierncrona

Births

 3 April  – Carl Gustaf af Leopold,  poet  (died 1829)
 23 April  –  Maria Elisabet de Broen, translator and theatre manager (died 1809)
 20 June - Joseph Martin Kraus, composer (died 1792)
 July 7- Gustaf Adolf Reuterholm, politician and royal favorite (died 1813)
 15 August – Olof Åhlström,  composer (died 1835)
 9 September – Christopher Christian Karsten, opera singer (died 1827)
 Date unknown - Brita Hagberg, war heroine (died 1825)
 Date unknown - Maria Katarina Öhrn, singer and actress (died 1783)
 Date unknown -  Henrik Gustaf Ulfvenklou, mystic and medium  (died 1819)
 Maria Nilsdotter i Ölmeskog, farmer and heroine  (died 1822)

Deaths

 24 June - Olof Celsius, botanist, philologist and clergyman
 23 July - Johan Puke, participator in the Coup of 1756
 23 July - Magnus Stålsvärd, participator in the Coup of 1756
 23 July - Gustaf Jacob Horn, participator in the Coup of 1756
 23 July - Erik Brahe, participator in the Coup of 1756

References

 
Years of the 18th century in Sweden
Sweden